The 1914 Michigan Wolverines football team represented the University of Michigan in the 1914 college football season. In their 14th season under head coach Fielding H. Yost, the Wolverines won their first five games by a combined score of 180 to 10, including three shutouts. They then lost three of the final four games to finish with a 6–3 record.

Michigan halfback John Maulbetsch was a consensus first-team selection for the 1914 College Football All-America Team.  Two other Michigan players, center James Raynsford and quarterback Tommy Hughitt, were named to Outing magazine's Football Roll of Honor. Raynsford was the team captain, and Hughitt was selected as the team's most valuable player.

Schedule

Season summary

Week 1: DePauw

Michigan opened the 1914 season with a 58–0 victory over DePauw.  Lawrence Splawn ran for two touchdowns, drop-kicked a field goal from the 27-yard line, and averaged 55 yards on three punts. Quarterback Tommy Hughitt threw touchdown pass to John Lyons, 20 yards in the air with Lyons running another 35 yards for the touchdown. In all, Michigan scored eight touchdowns, two each by Splawn, John Maulbetsch, and Hughitt, and one each by Lyons and Cohn.

Week 2: Case

On October 3, 1914, Michigan defeated Case by a 69 to 0 score. The game was played in 10-minute quarters at Ferry Field. Michigan's touchdowns were scored by Lawrence Roehm (2), John Maulbetsch (2), James Catlett (2), Tommy Hughitt (2), and Maurice Dunne. Hughitt also kicked nine points after touchdown.

Week 3: Mt. Union

On Wednesday, October 7, 1914, Michigan defeated Mt. Union 27 to 7. John Maulbetsch scored two touchdowns.  Lawrence Splawn scored a touchdown and kicked two field goals.

Week 4: Vanderbilt

On October 10, 1914, Michigan defeated Vanderbilt 23 to 3 at Ferry Field.  Michigan scored on two touchdowns by John Maulbetsch, a touchdown and points after touchdown by Tommy Hughitt, and a field goal by Lawrence Splawn.

Week 5: at M. A. C.

On October 17, 1914, Michigan won a close game over Michigan Agricultural College by 3–0 score at College Field in East Lansing. Michigan quarterback Tommy Hughitt sustained a dislocated elbow and was believed at the time to be lost for the remainder of the season. He ended up missing the following week's game against Syracuse but returned for the Harvard game.

Week 6: at Syracuse

After winning its first five games, Michigan lost to Syracuse by a 20 to 6 score on October 24, 1914. After a scoreless first half, each team scored a touchdown in the third quarter, and the fourth quarter began with the score tied at 6 to 6. Syracuse scored two touchdowns in the fourth quarter to win the game. John Maulbetsch accounted for Michigan's scoring with a touchdown and goal from touchdown.

Week 7: at Harvard

On October 31, 1914, Michigan lost to the undefeated 1914 Harvard Crimson football team by a 7 to 0 score at Harvard Stadium.  Harvard's All-American halfback Huntington Hardwick scored the game's only touchdown on a six-yard run in the second quarter.

Week 8: Penn

On November 7, 1914, Michigan defeated Penn 34 to 3 at Ferry Field. Michigan's five touchdowns were scored by John Maulbetsch (2), Tommy Hughitt, James Catlett, and Leland Benton. Hughitt also kicked four points after touchdown.

Week 9: Cornell

On November 14, 1914, Michigan ended its season at home with a loss to Cornell by a 28 to 13 score. Michigan took the lead in the first quarter on a pass from Lawrence Splawn to Karl Staatz.  Michigan extended its lead to 13 to 0 in the second quarter on a short touchdown run by John Maulbetsch who also kicked the goal from touchdown.  From that point forward, Michigan was unable to score while Cornell scored 28 points. Fullback Carl Phillipi scored three touchdowns for Cornell.

Roster

Letter winners

Reserves

 Frank Millard - started 1 game at right guard
 Frank D. Quail - started 3 games at left guard
 Fred Rehor - started 1 game at left guard
 Lawrence Roehm - started 3 games at right halfback
 William Watson - started 3 games at left guard and 3 games at right guard
 Jim Whalen - started 2 games at right guard, 1 game at right end

Awards and honors
Captain: James W. Raynsford
All-Americans: John Maulbetsch
Heston-Schulz Trophy (team MVP): Tommy Hughitt

Coaching staff
Head coach: Fielding H. Yost
Assistant coaches: William Cole (assistant coach), Prentiss Douglass (All-Fresh Coach), Germany Schulz (assistant coach)
Trainer: Stephen Farrell
Manager: John S. Leonard

Gallery

References

External links
 1914 Football Team -- Bentley Historical Library, University of Michigan Athletics History
 1914-1915 Michigan Alumnus - includes accounts of each game
 1915 Michiganensian - University of Michigan yearbook for the 1914-1915 academic year

Michigan
Michigan Wolverines football seasons
Michigan Wolverines football